L'Entregu Club de Fútbol is a Spanish football club based in El Entrego in the autonomous community of Asturias.

History
L'Entregu CF was founded in 1997, as an heir to both UD El Entrego and El Entrego CD. After several seasons in Regional Divisions, the club promoted for the first time to Tercera División in 2012.

In the 2019/20 season, the club founded their reserve team. They play in the Tercera RFFPA.

A season later they founded their women's team.

In the 2020/21 season they won their league group (the league was divided into two groups due to COVID) and qualified for the promotion phase. After finishing third in the promotion group, they faced CD Llanes in the semifinals of the promotion playoff, losing 1-3 after extra time.

Club background
UD El Entrego (1939–1963)
El Entrego CD (1964–1990)
L'Entregu CF (1997–present)

UD El Entrego was founded in 1939 from the merger of two local clubs, Arenas de Santana and Sporting del Norte. This club played two promotion phases to the Second Division, in 1956/57 and 1957/58. They were eliminated by A.D. Plus Ultra and CD Baracaldo Altos Hornos respectively. A few years later, in 1963, the club had financial problems and was dissolved.

El Entrego CD was founded in 1964 and unlike its predecessor, this club was not that successful. In their few years of history, they failed to promote to a division higher than the Third Division, with several relegations to the Regional Leagues. In 1990 the team is dissolved again.

Stadium 
L'Entregu played at the Nalón Stadium for most of its history. In 1997 the stadium was demolished for the construction of the AS-17 highway. Since that year they have played at the Nuevo Nalón Stadium, with a capacity for 1,200 spectators.

Rivalries 
Their biggest rivals are EI San Martín from Sotrondio. The towns are approximately 3 km apart and share the municipality of San Martín del Rey Aurelio. Both clubs have undergone refoundations throughout their history. The current clubs have met 12 times, with the sotrondinos being the ones with the most victories. On the other hand, the entreguinos have always been above their rivals in the table when they have been in the same division.

Season to season

8 seasons in Tercera División
1 season in Tercera División RFEF

Honours 

 Regional Preferente: 2015/16
 Primera Regional: 2006/07
 Segunda Regional: 1999/00

References

External links
Official website 
Profile at futbolme.com

Football clubs in Asturias
Association football clubs established in 1997
1997 establishments in Spain